William Thomas Reynolds (1870 – after 1893) was an English professional footballer who played in the Football League for Small Heath.

Reynolds was born in Tewkesbury, Gloucestershire. He joined Small Heath in April 1893, and made his debut in the Second Division on 14 October 1893 in a 4–3 home defeat to Liverpool. He was the player used most often at left back during the 1893–94 season, playing 13 games in all competitions, but was released following Small Heath's promotion as he was not thought good enough to play at a higher level.

References

1870 births
Year of death missing
People from Tewkesbury
English footballers
Association football fullbacks
Birmingham City F.C. players
Worcester City F.C. players
English Football League players
Date of birth missing
Place of death missing
Sportspeople from Gloucestershire